Legen is a settlement in the City Municipality of Slovenj Gradec in northern Slovenia. It lies in the valley of Barbara Creek and the surrounding Pohorje Hills east of Slovenj Gradec. The area is part of the traditional region of Styria. The entire municipality is now included in the Carinthia Statistical Region.

Two churches in the settlement are dedicated to Saint George and Saint Barbara and belong to the Parish of Šmartno pri Slovenj Gradcu. The former was built in the late 13th century on the site of an earlier Romanesque building and the latter dates to the early 16th century.

References

External links
Legen at Geopedia

Populated places in the City Municipality of Slovenj Gradec
Slovenj Gradec